Stanley Jedidiah Samartha (7 October 1920 – 22 July 2001) was an Indian theologian and a participant in inter-religious dialogue.

Samartha's major contribution was through the World Council of Churches (WCC) sub-unit "Dialogue with People of Living Faiths and Ideologies" of which he was the first director.

Western Scholars on Hinduism like Jan Peter Schouten brings Samartha in the line of thinking of M. M. Thomas (an Indian thinker) and Raimundo Panikkar (a Catholic Priest) terming them as the "Great Three"
 of whom Samartha was very involved in the developments in the Church in India.

Early life and education
Stanley Jedidiah was born on 7 October 1920 in Karkala, Karnataka into a pastoral family. His mother was a primary school Teacher while his father was a Pastor with the Basel Evangelical Mission. Stanley had his education at the Basel Evangelical Mission High School after which he enrolled at the local Government College. Later in 1939 he joined the Jesuit St. Aloysius College (then affiliated to the University of Madras) from where he obtained a B.A. in 1941.

Divinity
It felt natural for Stanley to follow in the footsteps of his father, a Pastor. The Basel Evangelical Mission Board approved his candidature for theological studies and sent him to the United Theological College, Bengaluru in 1941. While pursuing theology, Stanley was afflicted with typhoid which kept him out of the Seminary for a year. While at the Seminary, Samartha came under the influence of his Professors, particularly Marcus Ward and P. D. Devanandan. In 1945, he was awarded the graduate degree of BD from the Seminary.

Pastor and lecturership
From 1945 to 1947, Stanley served as an Assistant to the Pastor in Udipi. Stanley was appointed as lecturer in the Basel Evangelical Mission Theological Seminary (now Karnataka Theological College)
, Mangalore beginning from the academic year 1947 - 1948 to teach Theology and Religions. After availing study leave for the period 1949 - 1952 Samartha returned to the Seminary and resumed teaching responsibilities.

The Basel Evangelical Mission ordained S. J. Samartha on 30 March 1952.

In 1952, the Seminary made Samartha its Principal, a position in which he continued up to 1960. In fact, he was the Seminary's first Indian Principal. It was during Samartha's period at Mangalore that the Seminary became affiliated to the Senate of Serampore College (University), West Bengal.

Higher studies
The Basel Evangelical Mission sent Stanley to the Union Theological Seminary in the city of New York for post-graduate studies (S.T.M.) in 1949. He studied under Paul Tillich, the Christian existentialist Philosopher and worked out a thesis titled The Hindu View of History According to Dr. S. Radhakrishnan which eventually got published.

In 1950, Stanley enrolled as a doctoral candidate at the Hartford Theological Seminary, Connecticut and was awarded a PhD in 1951. Samartha's doctoral thesis was entitled The Modern Hindu View of History according to Representative Thinkers.

After completion of doctoral studies at Hartford Theological Seminary in 1951, Samartha spent a year at Basel, Switzerland at the invitation of the Basel Mission Board. Being at Basel seemed to have thrilled Samartha since it was the very mission board through which his parents came to Christ. While spending his days here, he also began attending Karl Barth's weekly lectures at the University of Basel besides visiting the local congregations in Switzerland as well as in Germany. It was here that he also met Hendrik Kraemer, the Dutch Reformed Theologian and the first Director of the Ecumenical Institute, Bossey.

Sabbatical
While being the Principal at Mangalore, Samartha availed a sabbatical and taught for an academic year (1957–1958) at his alma mater, the Hartford Theological Seminary before returning to Mangalore.

Professorship

Bengaluru
In 1960, Samartha moved to the United Theological College, Bengaluru where he began teaching Philosophy and History of Religions.

Serampore
William Stewart had been the Principal of Serampore College from 1959 to 1966. The Council of Serampore College appointed Samartha as the Principal of Serampore College {the only constituent college of the Senate of Serampore College (University)} in 1966. Samartha led the College through turbulent times up to 1968 after which he took up an assignment with the World Council of Churches. Among those who studied under his Principalship in Serampore included James Massey, S. Jeyapaul David and G. Babu Rao.

Appraisal by other Scholars
 Israel Selvanayagam, Principal, United Theological College, Bengaluru.

 Andreas Anangguru Yewangoe of Indonesia:

 Hans Schwarz, University of Regensburg, Germany.

 Veli-Matti Kärkkäinen, Professor of Systematic Theology, Fuller Theological Seminary, Pasadena.

 Timothy Yates, an Anglican Evangelical Missiologist, Durham.

 Kirsteen Kim, Past Lecturer, Union Biblical Seminary, Pune.

Contribution
Samartha was acknowledged as a leading authority on inter-religious dialogue. S. Wesley Ariarajah quotes Samartha on dialogue:

Criticism
Criticism wasn't too far. Sunand Sumithra in his doctoral dissertation defended at the University of Tübingen, Germany in 1981 criticised (page 217) the work of Samartha arguing that Samartha failed to project Christ's distinctness in a pluralistic context. However, Samartha responded that Sunand Sumithra was not aware of the beliefs of other faiths. Kirsteen Kim believed that Sunand Sumithra was indeed aware of the beliefs of others and only wanted to distinguish Christ from others.

Further, Sunand Sumithra in a book on Christian Theology from an Indian Perspective evaluated Samartha's writings. He summarised that Samartha resorted to Advaitic system not on theological grounds but on mere empirical enquiry.

Similarly, Ken Gnanakan of ACTS Institute, Bengaluru, argued that Samartha's writings failed to uphold the Biblical Text in a setting of theology of religions.

Sunand Sumithra and Ken Gnanakan may have been right in their argument if one looks into a recent doctoral work by Dirk Griffioen submitted to the Utrecht University where Dirk brings to light the fact that Samartha rejected the Dutch Reformed Theologian Hendrik Kraemer's version of Christology stating that it was Christomonistic and not theocentric.

Samartha first met Hendrik Kraemer in Bossey during his sabbatical in Basel.

Stint at WCC
After being relieved as Principal of Serampore College, Serampore in 1968, Samartha served as Associate Secretary, Department of Studies in Mission and Evangelism in Geneva up to 1971 working closely with Hans-Jochen Margull, Professor of Missions at the University of Hamburg, Hamburg.

It was at the Central Committee meeting at Addis Ababa in 1971 that a sub-unit of the WCC Dialogue with People of Living Faiths and Ideologies was set up with Samartha as its first Director. S. Wesley Ariarajah succeeded Samartha at the WCC.

Honours
In 1982, the Karnataka Theological College, Mangalore brought out a festschrift in his honour edited by the then Principal Rev. Dr. C. D. Jathanna entitled Dialogue in Community: Essays in Honour of Stanley J. Samartha.

India's first University, the Senate of Serampore College (University) in West Bengal conferred upon Samartha an honorary doctorate in 1986

In the same year, the Utrecht University, Utrecht, The Netherlands also awarded him an honorary doctorate.

Retirement and death
In 1980, Samartha returned to India after his stint in Geneva with the WCC was over and was Consultant to the Christian Institute for Study of Religion and Society (CISRS), Bengaluru and also Visiting Professor at the United Theological College, Bengaluru. After 1989, Samartha returned to India and got empanelled on South Asia Theological Research Institute's Committee supervising theses on Theology and Religions in Bengaluru.

A Press Release issued by the World Council of Churches Office of Communication on 24 July 2001 stated that Stanley Samartha died of prolonged illness on 22 July 2001 in Bengaluru.

Tributes
 Georges Lemopoulos, Acting general secretary (2001), World Council of Churches, Geneva.

See also
 Rev. Dr B. V. Subbamma
 Rev. Yisu Das Tiwari
 Bishop N. D. Ananda Rao Samuel
 Rev. Fr. Dr D. S. Amalorpavadass
 Rev. Emani Sambayya
 Bishop Victor Premasagar
 Rev. Joshua Russell Chandran

References

Further reading
 S. K. Samartha, Introduction to Radhakrishnan (1964)
 
 
 
 
 
 
 

People in interfaith dialogue
Hartford Seminary alumni
Indian Christian theologians
Kannada people
Indian Anglican priests
Christian clergy from Bangalore
Mangaloreans
People from Dakshina Kannada district
1920 births
2001 deaths
Senate of Serampore College (University) alumni
Academic staff of the Senate of Serampore College (University)